The Heritage Party is a Eurosceptic, right-wing populist and socially conservative political party in the United Kingdom  founded in October 2020 when then London Assembly Member David Kurten left the UK Independence Party (UKIP) to form the party. Kurten was also a member of the Brexit Alliance, a Eurosceptic technical group he formed in 2018 with fellow former UKIP member Peter Whittle.

History 

In January 2020, Kurten announced he would be running as an independent candidate in the upcoming London mayoral and London Assembly elections (then scheduled for May 2020, but both elections were postponed to 2021 due to the COVID-19 pandemic). Kurten founded the Heritage Party, and it was registered with the Electoral Commission that October.

In December 2020, Kurten rejected a COVID-19 vaccine, for which he was denounced by the Conservative mayoral candidate Shaun Bailey, who saw this as irresponsible for an elected politician. Lockdowns in response to the coronavirus pandemic in the United Kingdom have been condemned by Kurten. Kurten has been criticised for spreading anti-COVID-19 vaccine misinformation.

Elections

May 2021 London elections
Kurten came 15th in the 2021 London mayoral election with 0.4% of the vote. Heritage came 13th in the Assembly election with 0.5% of the vote. Kurten thus lost his seat in the Assembly (to which he had been elected second on the UKIP list at the 2016 election).

Parliamentary by-elections 
The party has stood in six by-elections so far:

London Assembly

Northern Ireland Assembly

References 

UK Independence Party breakaway groups
Political parties established in 2020
Eurosceptic parties in the United Kingdom
Conservative parties in the United Kingdom
Right-wing populist parties
Social conservative parties
2020 establishments in the United Kingdom